Zavodskaya sestra crossover is a railway bridge across  Zavodskaya Sestra River. 
The engineer was P. A. Avenarius.

References 

Rail bridges in Saint Petersburg